BGC Canada (Boys & Girls Clubs of Canada) is a national, nonprofit organization that supports local Boys and Girls Clubs with programs for physical activity, healthy living, learning, job training, leadership, and creative expression. With locations in small towns and large cities, as well as rural and Indigenous communities, Boys and Girls Clubs provide services to young people during critical out-of-school hours.

History
In 1900, a group of concerned local citizens in Saint John, New Brunswick set up a "public playground movement" to provide a safe place for children to play, in particular boys from disadvantaged circumstances who had no place to go after school. Originally established as the "Every Day Club," it was later named The East End Boys Club of Saint John, the first "Boys Club" in Canada.

In 1929, the Boys’ Club Federation of Canada was officially established by Vernon McAdam, the first National Executive Director. In 1947, the organization was renamed Boys’ Clubs of Canada, and a year later was recognized by Parliament of Canada as a national, nonprofit organization. In 1974, to reflect the growing number of young girls participating in Club programs, the organization changed its name to "Boys and Girls Clubs of Canada."

During the COVID-19 pandemic, BGC Canada received a $500,000 grant from the Public Health Agency of Canada's Immunization Partnership Fund to combat vaccine hesitancy and promote COVID-19 vaccine uptake in families and youth accessing BGC programs.

Size and reach
As of 2019, BGC Canada serves 200,000 children and youth at 700 service locations across the country. The Clubs employ 6,720 staff members and have 18,200 volunteers. In 2018, BGC Canada offered 26 national programs, facilitated $182,270 in scholarships, and allocated $6.2 million in grants to Clubs. Since 1900, Boys and Girls Clubs have helped over 3 million young Canadians.

Board of Directors
The voluntary Board of Directors provides national leadership, making policy directions and decisions and assigning responsibilities for implementation and management to the President & CEO.

2019 National Board

Officers
 Felix Wu, Chair
Thomas Clift, Vice-Chair
David Mather, Treasurer / BGCC Foundation Chair
Holly Toupin, Secretary

Directors
Becky Penrice
Michelle Banik
Gordon Floyd
Nicole Galarneau
Sarah Midanik
Rachel Barry
Shawn Cornett
Bob Harriman
Trevor Daroux
Davinder Valeri

See also
Boys & Girls Clubs of America

References

External links
Boys and Girls Clubs of Canada National Website

Youth organizations based in Canada
Organizations established in 1900
Organizations based in Toronto
Youth organizations established in the 1900s